The Ugandan records in swimming are the fastest ever performances of swimmers from Uganda, which are recognised and ratified by the Uganda Swimming Federation (USF).

All records were set in finals unless noted otherwise.

Long Course (50 m)

Men

Women

Mixed relay

Short Course (25 m)

Men

Women

Mixed relay

References

External links
 USF web site

Uganda
Records
Swimming
Swimming